Nils Evert Eklöf (25 July 1904 – 22 December 1987) was a Swedish runner. He competed at the 1928 Summer Olympics in the 3000 m steeplechase and 5000 m events and finished fourth in the steeplechase.

Eklöf initially trained as a boxer. He changed to running in 1923, and already by 1927 was ranked first in the world over 3000 and 5000 m distances. At the 1928 Olympics he abandoned his 5000 m race, but finished fourth in the steeplechase, which he rarely ran before. After that he continued running and worked as a planning supervisor and a sports adviser.

References

1904 births
1987 deaths
Swedish male long-distance runners
Swedish male steeplechase runners
Olympic athletes of Sweden
Athletes (track and field) at the 1928 Summer Olympics
Athletes from Stockholm